Espresso con panna, which means "espresso with cream" in Italian, is a single or double shot of espresso topped with whipped cream. In France and in the United Kingdom it is known as café Viennois.

In northern continental Europe, the term Wiener Melange refers to a different drink, made with foamed milk and having no whipped cream on top. In Vienna, an espresso con panna is properly called a Franziskaner, but ordering a Wiener Melange may sometimes yield the arrival of Espresso con panna even in Vienna.

In France, café Viennois refers to both an espresso con panna and a Wiener Melange.
In Australia, a similar drink may be called Café Vienna although Espresso con panna will traditionally be in an espresso sized cup, whereas Café Vienna will be served in the same size as a latte.

Historically served in a demitasse cup, it is perhaps a more old fashioned drink than a latte or cappuccino, though still very popular, whichever name it receives, at coffeehouses in Budapest and Vienna.

See also
 Café liégeois

References

External links
Turkish Coffee

Coffee drinks